Sir Richard Southwell PC (c.1502/03 – 11 January 1564) was an English Privy Councillor.

Biography
He was born at Windham Manor in Norfolk, the son of Francis Southwell, an auditor of the exchequer, and Dorothy (née Tendring).  He was the eldest brother of Robert Southwell, Francis Southwell and Anthony Southwell (husband of Anne Le Strange, daughter of Sir Thomas Le Strange). His paternal grandparents were Richard Southwell (d. 1514), Marshal of the Exchequer, and his wife Amy, the coheiress and eldest of the four daughters of Edmund Witchingham of Conningsby, Lincolnshire. His maternal grandparents were William Tendring, Esquire, of Stoke by Naylond in Suffolk and Little Birch in Essex, of whom his mother was coheiress, and his wife Thomasine, daughter of William Sidney. Richard's father died in 1512, and he inherited the estate.  Less than two years later he was also to inherit the estate of his uncle Sir Robert Southwell (who had served as seneschal for estates forfeited to Henry VII).  In 1515 he became the ward of his uncle's widow and William Wootton, his aunt's husband. Sir Robert’s widow was Elizabeth Calthorpe (d.1517), the daughter of Sir Philip Calthorpe of Burnham Thorpe, Norfolk.  She would become the second wife of Thomas Brooke, 8th Baron Cobham.  In 1519 Thomas Wyndham acquired the wardship.

Wyndham married Southwell to his stepdaughter Thomasin, who was the daughter of Roger Darcy of Danbury in Essex and sister of Thomas Darcy, 1st Baron Darcy of Chiche. They had a daughter. He later married Mary, the daughter of Thomas Darcy of Danbury, and the widow of Robert Leeche of Norwich, Norfolk. They had one legitimate daughter and two illegitimate sons (including Richard Southwell alias Darcy) and two illegitimate daughters.

In 1526 he entered Lincoln's Inn. He became tutor to Gregory Cromwell, son of Thomas.  For some period Gregory lived with Southwell in Woodrising Manor in Norfolk, which Southwell had inherited from his uncle. In 1531 Southwell became a Justice of the Peace for Norfolk and Suffolk. In the same year, he was involved in the murder of Sir William Pennington and the following year he paid a fine of £1000 to obtain a pardon. In lieu of money he gave King Henry VIII his Essex manors of Coggeshall and Filolls Hall. He had previously bought the manor in 1529 from the cousins Thomas Thursby (d. 1532) of Hillington, Norfolk and Edmund Beaupré.

From 1534 to 1535, Southwell was High Sheriff of Norfolk and Suffolk. It was in 1536 that his portrait was painted by Hans Holbein the Younger. He was a witness in the trial of Sir Thomas More, where he claimed not to have heard the details of the damning conversation between Richard Rich and the accused. He was elected to the House of Commons in 1539 as knight of the shire for Norfolk and knighted in 1540. After the death of James V of Scotland, Southwell went to Edinburgh in January 1543 to negotiate with the Scottish lords.
Southwell was a principal accuser of Henry Howard, Earl of Surrey, who was arrested in December 1546 on charges (very likely trumped up) of threatening the succession of Prince Edward by displaying the lions of England in his personal coat of arms. Following the arrest of Surrey's father, Thomas Howard, third duke of Norfolk, Southwell was one of three royal commissioners (along with Sir John Gates and Wymond Carew) sent to seize and inventory the Howards' possessions. He was one of the assistants to the executors of the will of Henry VIII.

Southwell was one of the signatories of The Will of King Edward the Sixth, and His Devise for the Succession to the Crown. He was appointed to the Privy Council on 12 March 1547, although he was removed from the full council the following year.  He was reappointed by Mary I of England. Southwell was described as the driving force behind the plan to marry Elizabeth I of England to Edward Courtenay, 1st Earl of Devon. He was re-elected to represent Norfolk again in 1542, 1553 and twice in 1554.

He was Master of the Armoury from 1554 to 1559.

Notes

References

External links
Biography, details of which are taken from the History of Parliament
Edward VI's Will and Device for Succession
ODNB entry

1500s births
1564 deaths
People from Wymondham
High Sheriffs of Norfolk
High Sheriffs of Suffolk
English MPs 1539–1540
English MPs 1542–1544
English MPs 1553 (Mary I)
English MPs 1554
English MPs 1554–1555
Members of Lincoln's Inn
Members of the Privy Council of England
English courtiers
Knights Bachelor
Members of the Parliament of England for Norfolk
Court of Mary I of England
Richard